Prairie View is an unincorporated community located in northeastern Illinois, in southern Lake County. It is a part of Vernon Township (the Vernon Township building was previously located in Prairie View for many years). Prairie View has not been annexed entirely by either Lincolnshire or Buffalo Grove, although tiny portions of it have been.

Development
In recent years, Prairie View has been divided into two sections as surrounding towns have annexed their neighboring settlements and tiny portions of Prairie View itself.

The northern section, which contains the Prairie View Metra station, is near Stevenson High School and is bordered by Vernon Hills to the north, Lincolnshire to the east and Buffalo Grove to the south and west. This section receives its water, sewer, and fire emergency service from Lincolnshire; all other services are provided by Vernon Township and Lake County. A modern subdivision (consisting of about 50 homes) located in this section was built during the 1990s on what had previously been farmland and is called Krisview Acres. The original homes in the area (approximately 28), located exclusively on Easton Avenue, Main Street and a few small side streets, were built piecemeal between the late 19th century and early 1980s.

The other section is a short distance south and is completely surrounded by Buffalo Grove. This subdivision is called Horatio Gardens and is close to the Buffalo Grove train station. The residents of this subdivision resisted being overtaken by Buffalo Grove Park District and currently still defend their rights to be an independent part of unincorporated Prairie View.

Demographics
Prairie View was originally made up almost entirely of white/caucasian people, however since the 1990s it has become more diverse and currently contains a very large Jewish population. A well known Chabad shul is located there.

Schools
Northern Prairie View is served by Lincolnshire-Prairie View School District 103. Schools that comprise this district are Daniel Wright Junior High School, Half Day Intermediate School, and Laura B. Sprague Elementary School (all in Lincolnshire). Most inhabitants of Prairie View who attend District 103 schools graduate to Stevenson High School.

Residents of the southern portion of Prairie View are served by the Aptakisic-Tripp School district, made up of Tripp Elementary School, Pritchett Elementary School, Meridian Middle School, and Aptakisic Junior High School.

Churches
Local churches include the Westminster Reformed Presbyterian Church (founded in 1906 as the Grace Evangelical Church, later renamed Grace United Methodist Church after merging first with the United Brethren in Christ and then the American Methodist Church).

Entertainment
Prairie View has one roadhouse-style tavern, known as The Prairie House. For many years, an American Legion post stood on Easton Avenue, however it moved to a new building in the 1990s and the original building currently houses offices.

Transportation
Prairie View has a stop on Metra's North Central Service, which provides daily rail service between Antioch, Illinois and Chicago, Illinois (at Union Station).

Notable people
Jean Ladd (1923–2009), All-American Girls Professional Baseball League player, born and raised in Prairie View.
Joe Lando (born 1961), actor best known for his role of Byron Sully on the TV Series Dr. Quinn, Medicine Woman, born in Prairie View.
Mosheh Oinounou (born 1982), former executive producer of CBS Evening News

Image gallery

References

External links
 Local Presbyterian Church website with photographs

Unincorporated communities in Illinois
Unincorporated communities in Lake County, Illinois